Millington Municipal Schools (MMS) is a public school district serving Millington, Tennessee within the Memphis metropolitan area, United States. It was formed in 2013.

The district's schools are Millington Primary School, Millington Intermediate School and Millington Central Middle High School.

In addition to serving the city of Millington, it also serves the Millington Annexation Reserve, which is a large-divided unincorporated area within Shelby County.

References

External links
 

School districts in Shelby County, Tennessee
School districts established in 2013